7th FFCC Awards 
January 3, 2003

Best Film: 
 Adaptation. 
The 7th Florida Film Critics Circle Awards, honoring the best in film for 2002, were announced on 3 January 2003.

Winners
Best Actor: 
Daniel Day-Lewis - Gangs of New York as William "Bill" Cutting
Best Actress: 
Julianne Moore - Far from Heaven
Best Animated Film: 
Spirited Away (Sen to Chihiro no kamikakushi)
Best Cast: 
Thirteen Conversations About One Thing
Best Cinematography: 
Far from Heaven - Edward Lachman
Best Director: 
Martin Scorsese - Gangs of New York
Best Documentary Film: 
Bowling for Columbine
Best Film: 
Adaptation.
Best Foreign Language Film: 
And Your Mother Too (Y Tu Mama Tambien) • Mexico/USA
Best Screenplay: 
Adaptation. - Charlie and Donald Kaufman
Best Supporting Actor: 
Chris Cooper - Adaptation. as John Laroche
Best Supporting Actress: 
Meryl Streep - Adaptation. as Susan Orlean

2
F